Steve Lawson may refer to:

Steven F. Lawson (born 1945), American historian of the civil rights movement
Steve Lawson (musician) (born 1972), British bass guitarist
Steve Lawson (American football) (born 1949), American football guard 
Steve Lawson (baseball) (born 1950), Major League Baseball pitcher
Steve Lawson (footballer) (born 1994) Togolese footballer
Stephen Lawson (born 1968), Zimbabwean cricketer
Steve Lawson (speedway rider) (born 1957), English speedway rider